Cumia alfredensis, common name : the narrow dwarf triton,  is a species of sea snail, a marine gastropod mollusk in the family Colubrariidae.

Description
The shell size varies between 20 mm and 50 mm

Distribution
It is distributed along KwaZuluNatal, South Africa

References

External links
 

Colubrariidae
Gastropods described in 1915